Rana Nazeer Ahmed Khan (born 10 December 1949 in Lalupur village, Gujranwala district) is a Pakistani politician studied law and became a successful lawyer and then came into politics. He joined Pakistan Muslim League (Nawaz) he was secretary general of Punjab province in 1998 as well as president of PML-N for Punjab in 1999, he is former federal minister (1990–93; 1997–99; 2002–04), and he is member national assembly (since 1985 till 2018), chairman district council Gujranwala. He joined PTI in 2018 and left PML-N.(1979–1992) Kamoke, Gujranwala.

References

Pakistani lawyers
Pakistani politicians
Living people
1949 births
Members of the National Assembly of Pakistan